SMO or Smo may refer to:

War 
 Special Military Operation - Russia's name for the invasion of Ukraine during the 2014 - present war.

Biology
 Smoothened, a gene that encodes a protein of the same name
 Spermine oxidase, an enzyme
 Styrene monooxygenase, an enzyme

Computing and technology
 Sequential minimal optimization, an algorithm for training support vector machines
 Social media optimization
 Solar Monitoring Observatory, on the International Space Station
 SQL Server Management Objects for Microsoft SQL Server

Organizations
 Sabhal Mòr Ostaig, a Scottish Gaelic-medium public college on the Isle of Skye
 Slovak Youth Orchestra

Transport
 SMO, IATA airport code for Santa Monica Airport, USA
 SMO, National Rail station code for South Merton railway station, London

Other uses
 smo, ISO 639-3 code for the Samoan language
 Smo, former stage name of Sara Forsberg (born 1994), Finnish singer
 Senior Medical Officer, a rank in the British Royal Army Medical Corps
 Singapore Mathematical Olympiad, a mathematics competition
 Site management organization, a provider of services to an organization holding a clinical trial
 Social movement organization, a formal organization within a social movement
 Special Military Operation, particularly by Russia in Ukraine
 Super Mario Odyssey, a video game released for the Nintendo Switch